was a town located in Naka District, Shimane Prefecture, Japan.

As of 2003, the town had an estimated population of 3,076 and a density of 23.92 persons per km². The total area was 128.57 km².

On October 1, 2005, Asahi, along with the towns of Kanagi and Misumi, and the village of Yasaka (all from Naka District), was merged into the expanded city of Hamada.

Dissolved municipalities of Shimane Prefecture